The 1992 NSW Open was a combined men's and women's tennis tournament played on outdoor hard courts at the NSW Tennis Centre in Sydney, Australia that was part of the World Series of the 1992 ATP Tour and Tier II of the 1992 WTA Tour. It was the 100th edition of the tournament and was held from 6 January through 12 January 1994. Emilio Sánchez and Gabriela Sabatini won the singles titles.

Finals

Men's singles
 Emilio Sánchez defeated  Guy Forget, 6–3, 6–4

Women's singles
 Gabriela Sabatini defeated  Arantxa Sánchez Vicario, 6–1, 6–1

Men's doubles
 Sergio Casal /  Emilio Sánchez defeated  Scott Davis /  Kelly Jones, 3–6, 6–1, 6–4

Women's doubles
 Arantxa Sánchez Vicario /  Helena Suková defeated  Mary Joe Fernández /  Zina Garrison-Jackson, 7–6(7–4), 6–7(4–7), 6–2

References

External links
 Official website
 ITF tournament edition details (men)
 ITF tournament edition dteails (women)

1992 WTA Tour
1992 in Australian tennis
1990s in Sydney
January 1992 sports events in Australia